Kiriri Women's University of Science and Technology, often referred to as KWUST, is a non-state funded secular women's university in Nairobi, Kenya. It was started in 2002 Its aim is to empower women in sciences. Kiriri Women's University is the only women's university in east and southern Africa. Its main campus in located in Mwihoko, Githurai in the outskirt of Nairobi
Kiriri has no male gender. 
It offers B.Science degrees in mathematics (actuarial, pure, statistics), computer science and business administration, as well as diplomas and certificates.

Admission is in May and September every year.

References

External links
 Official website
 Universities and Colleges in Kenya

Private universities and colleges in Kenya
Education in Nairobi
Educational institutions established in 2002
2002 establishments in Kenya
Women in Nairobi
Women's universities and colleges